Ignacio Elías Ibáñez Santana (born 8 October 1996) is a Chilean professional footballer who plays as a winger for Chilean Primera División side Unión Española.

Career
A product of Ñublense youth system, he made his debut in the Chilean Primera División while he was on loan at Everton in 2018. After ending his contract with Ñublense, he moved to Cobreloa in the Primera B. After a step in Deportes Concepción, he joined Unión Española for the 2022 Primera División.

References

External links
 
 Ignacio Ibáñez at playmakerstats.com (English version of ceroacero.es)

1996 births
Living people
People from Chillán
Chilean footballers
Association football forwards
Ñublense footballers
Everton de Viña del Mar footballers
Cobreloa footballers
Deportes Concepción (Chile) footballers
Unión Española footballers
Segunda División Profesional de Chile players
Primera B de Chile players
Chilean Primera División players